Karl-Wilhelm Sirkka (born 4 October 1939) is a Norwegian transport researcher, businessperson and  politician for the Conservative Party.

He was born in Vadsø. He has his education from the Norwegian School of Management, the Institute of Transport Economics and the University of Tromsø and has worked as a researcher at Molde University College.

In politics, he was a central committee member of the Norwegian Young Conservatives and secretary for the Conservative Party in Finnmark. From 1981 to 1983 he was a State Secretary in the Ministry of Transport and Communications, as a part of Willoch's First Cabinet.

He resides in Tromsø. He contributed to the failed 2018 Winter Olympic bid for Tromsø.

References

1939 births
Living people
Conservative Party (Norway) politicians
Norwegian state secretaries
BI Norwegian Business School alumni
Norwegian newspaper editors
People from Vadsø
Politicians from Tromsø